Kottaipattinam is a village panchayat located in the Pudukkottai district of Tamil Nadu state, India. The latitude 9.97908 and longitude 79.198595 are the geocoordinate of the Kottaipattinam. The Kottaipattinam Population is 13454. Male is 6668. Female is 6786.

Geography

Kottaipattinam is located around 61.1 kilometers away from its district headquarter Pudukkottai. The other nearest district headquarters is Sivaganga situated at 13.0 km distance from Kottaipattinam . Surrounding districts from Kottaipattinam are as follows.
 Ramanathapuram ( ramanathapuram ) district	79.0 km.
 Sivaganga ( sivaganga ) district	79.6 km.
 Thanjavur ( thanjavur ) district	89.7 km.
 Tiruchirappalli ( tiruchirappalli ) district	90.2 km.

Chennai is the state capital for Kottaipattinam village. It is located around 366.3 kilometers away from Kottaipattinam.   
Kottaipattinam is in the UTC 5.30 time zone and it follows Indian Standard Time (IST).

Demographics

Languages  
The native language of Kottaipattinam is Tamil and most of the village people speak Tamil. Kottaipattinam people use Tamil language for communication.

Government and politics

Economy

Transport

By Air  
Kottaipattinam's nearest airport is Thanjavur Air Force Station situated at 83.6 km distance. Few more airports around Kottaipattinam are as follows.
 Thanjavur Air Force Station	83.6 km.
Tiruchirappalli International Airport	102.2 km.
Madurai Airport	122.5 km.

By Rail  
The nearest railway station to Kottaipattinam is Ayingudi which is located in and around 28.9 kilometers away. The following table shows other railway stations and its distance from Mamakudi.
 Ayingudi railway station	28.9 km.
 Arantangi railway station	30.3 km.
 Valaramanikkam railway station	33.5 km.
 Peravurani railway station	34.1 km.
 Kandanur Puduvayal railway station	41.9 km.

By Road

Education
Schools in Kottaipattinam has been listed as follows. 
 Government Higher Secondary School 
 Government High School (Girls)
 M.H.Higher Secondary School

Nearest town/city to Kottaipattinam 
Kottaipattinam's nearest town/city/important place is Perumagalur located at the distance of 20.6 kilometer. Surrounding town/city/TP/CT from Kottaipattinam are as follows.
 Aranthangi	36km.
 Devakottai	55.0 km.
 Thondi	33.4 km.
 Pattukottai 55

The surrounding nearby villages and its distance from Kottaipattinam are Karakathikottai 2.4 km, Manamelkudi 2.4 km, Minnamozhi 2.7 km, Ammapattinam 5.4 km, Seyyanam 6.3 km, Manalmelkudi 8.0 km, Vellur 9.0 km, Mumpalai 10.2 km, Kolendram 11.6 km, Bramanavayal 13.5 km, Sathiyadi 14.6 km, Krishnajipattinam 15.6 km, Nilayur, Nerkuppai, Edayathoor, Manaloor, Vichoor, .

Reference 

Cities and towns in Pudukkottai district